Tangra Yumco  is a salt lake in Tibet, China. It is in the southwest of Nyima County. It is the holy lake of the
Bön believers.

Climate

Notes

Lakes of Tibet